Codora is an unincorporated community in Glenn County, California with a population of 100. The most prominent mayor was James Dean Hansen.

References

Unincorporated communities in California
Unincorporated communities in Glenn County, California